Golay Wali is a village that is one of the 35 Union Councils (administrative subdivisions) of Khushab District in the Punjab Province of Pakistan. It is located at 32°29'21″N 71°50'46″E.

History

Golay Wali  is an ancient village which is located in Lap Muhar (Daaman-e-Muhar).
Dodha(ڈھوڈا) is its older name.
New name Golay Wali was established due to the name of Gola Khan (گولا خان) who first time rehabilitated this area and gave name Golay Wali.
Gola Khan (گولا خان) came from Ghaznavi which is a province of Afghanistan before two centuries ago.
Later he settled in Dodha (ڈھوڈا) whose new name is Golay Wali.

Location
Golewali is situated in the pale of the Salt Range Mountains also called Daman-e-Mahar. It starts from the hilly area of mountains and ends at plain fieldy areas near Bandial Shumali. It is at a little distance from famous Soon-Valley Sakesar which makes it more nice place. It is at the extreme border of District Khushab and Mianwali. So its culture is more like Mianwali than Khushab.

References

Union councils of Khushab District
Populated places in Khushab District